The communauté de communes de la Côte d'Albâtre was created on December 28, 2001 and is located in the Seine-Maritime département of the Normandy region of northern France. It was enlarged with the former Communauté de communes Entre Mer et Lin and 6 communes from the former Communauté de communes Cœur de Caux on 1 January 2017. It consists of 63 communes, and its seat is in Cany-Barville. Its area is 387.5 km2, and its population was 27,799 in 2018.

Composition
The communauté de communes consists of the following 63 communes:

 Ancourteville-sur-Héricourt 
 Angiens 
 Anglesqueville-la-Bras-Long 
 Auberville-la-Manuel 
 Autigny 
 Bertheauville 
 Bertreville 
 Beuzeville-la-Guérard 
 Blosseville 
 Bosville 
 Le Bourg-Dun 
 Bourville 
 Brametot 
 Butot-Vénesville 
 Cailleville 
 Canouville 
 Cany-Barville 
 La Chapelle-sur-Dun 
 Clasville 
 Cleuville 
 Crasville-la-Mallet 
 Crasville-la-Rocquefort 
 Criquetot-le-Mauconduit 
 Drosay 
 Ermenouville 
 Fontaine-le-Dun 
 La Gaillarde 
 Grainville-la-Teinturière 
 Gueutteville-les-Grès 
 Le Hanouard 
 Hautot-l'Auvray 
 Héberville 
 Houdetot 
 Ingouville 
 Malleville-les-Grès 
 Manneville-ès-Plains 
 Le Mesnil-Durdent 
 Néville 
 Normanville 
 Ocqueville 
 Oherville 
 Ouainville 
 Ourville-en-Caux 
 Paluel 
 Pleine-Sève 
 Saint-Aubin-sur-Mer 
 Sainte-Colombe 
 Saint-Martin-aux-Buneaux 
 Saint-Pierre-le-Vieux
 Saint-Pierre-le-Viger 
 Saint-Riquier-ès-Plains 
 Saint-Sylvain 
 Saint-Vaast-Dieppedalle 
 Saint-Valery-en-Caux 
 Sasseville 
 Sommesnil 
 Sotteville-sur-Mer 
 Thiouville 
 Veauville-lès-Quelles 
 Veules-les-Roses 
 Veulettes-sur-Mer 
 Vinnemerville 
 Vittefleur

See also
Communes of the Seine-Maritime department

References 

Cote d'Albatre
Cote d'Albatre